The canton of Dourdan is an administrative division of the Essonne department, Île-de-France region, northern France. Its borders were modified at the French canton reorganisation which came into effect in March 2015. Its seat is in Dourdan.

It consists of the following communes:

Angervilliers
Breuillet
Breux-Jouy
Briis-sous-Forges
Chamarande
Chauffour-lès-Étréchy
Corbreuse
Courson-Monteloup
Dourdan
Étréchy
Fontenay-lès-Briis
La Forêt-le-Roi
Forges-les-Bains
Les Granges-le-Roi
Janvry
Limours
Mauchamps
Richarville
Roinville
Saint-Chéron
Saint-Cyr-sous-Dourdan
Saint-Maurice-Montcouronne
Saint-Sulpice-de-Favières
Sermaise
Souzy-la-Briche
Le Val-Saint-Germain
Vaugrigneuse
Villeconin

References

Cantons of Essonne